Archery was contested at the 1982 Asian Games in New Delhi, India.

The competition included only recurve events.

Medalists

Medal table

References

External links 
 Men's team medalists
 Women's team medalists

 
1982 Asian Games events
1982
Asian Games
1982 Asian Games